The men's pole vault event at the 2007 Pan American Games was held on July 28.

Results

References
Official results

Pole
2007